South Dakota State Highway 224 (SD 224) is a  state highway located in south-central South Dakota. It connects the town of Alpena to SD 37.

Route description

SD 224 begins at Willow Avenue in the town of Alpena in Jerauld County. The highway travels due east on 221st Street, crossing over a railroad and leaving the town, into Sanborn County. From the county line, SD 224 continues  to a junction with SD 37, where the highway ends.

History

SD 224 was designated in 1976 on a segment of former South Dakota Highway 32.

Major intersections

References

224
Transportation in Jerauld County, South Dakota
Transportation in Sanborn County, South Dakota